Let Us Garlands Bring is the second full-length recording by American band Early Day Miners. It was originally released on Indiana label Secretly Canadian.

The album title is a quotation from Shakespeare's song "Who Is Silvia?" in his play The Two Gentlemen of Verona.

Track listing
"Centralia"
"Santa Carolina"
"Offshore"
"Silvergate"
"Summer Ends"
"Autumn Wake"
"Light in August"
"A Common Wealth"

Personnel
Dan Burton: vocals, guitar
Joseph Brumley: guitar
Rory Leitch: drums
Matt Lindblom: bass
Maggie Polk: violin
Carl Saff: mastering

References

2002 albums
Early Day Miners albums
Secretly Canadian albums